Red, White and Zero is a 1967 British anthology film made by Woodfall Film Productions.  It was originally commissioned by producer Oscar Lewenstein, then a director of Woodfall, with sections supplied by Lindsay Anderson, Tony Richardson and Karel Reisz.

Plot (including cast list)

The film is split into three sections of the following stories.

Ride of the Valkyrie

An opera singer (Zero Mostel), dressed in full costume and dress, must navigate through the busy city streets to get to the theater in time for his performance.

 Zero Mostel
 Frank Thornton
 Julia Foster

The White Bus

The main character, only referred to as 'the girl' (Patricia Healey) leaves London, goes north on a train full of football fans and takes a trip in a white double-decker bus in an unnamed city she is visiting, although it is clearly based on Manchester, Delaney was born and grew up in nearby Salford. The Mayor (Arthur Lowe), a local businessman, and the council's ceremonial macebearer (John Sharp) happen also to be taking the trip while they show the city to visiting foreigners.

 Patricia Healey as The Girl
 Arthur Lowe as The Mayor
 John Sharp as The Macebearer
 Julie Perry as The Conductress
 Stephen Moore as Young Man
 Victor Henry as Transistorite
 John Savident, Fanny Carby, Malcolm Taylor, Alan O'Keeffe as Supporters
 Anthony Hopkins as Brechtian
 Jeanne Watts, Eddie King as Fish Shop Couple
 Barry Evans as Boy
 Penny Ryder as Girl
 Dennis Alaba Peters as Mr. Wombe

Red and Blue

An english cabaret singer (Vanessa Redgrave) goes to Paris for a nightclub engagement, where the romantic image of her songs is very different from the reality of her solitary life.

 Vanessa Redgrave as Jacky
 John Bird as Man on Train
 Gary Raymond as Songwriter
 Michael York as Acrobat
 Douglas Fairbanks, Jr. as Millionaire

History and Production

When Reisz's planned segment evolved into the feature-length Morgan: A Suitable Case for Treatment, Peter Brook's Ride of the Valkyrie became the replacement. The two other planned sections of the film developed into what became Richardson's Red and Blue and Anderson's The White Bus. Of these, only The White Bus received a theatrical release in the UK.

The rediscovered film was eventually released by the BFI on Blu-ray and DVD in 2018.

References

1967 films
British direct-to-video films
1960s rediscovered films
Rediscovered British films
1960s English-language films
Films directed by Lindsay Anderson